Thirudathe is a 1961 Indian Tamil-language drama film directed by P. Neelakantan. A remake of the Hindi film Pocket Maar (1956), it stars M. G. Ramachandran, B. Saroja Devi and M. N. Nambiar. The film was released on 23 March 1961, and ran for 100 days in theatres. It was remade in Kannada as Manassakshi (1968).

Plot 

Balu is a small-time thief. Once he happens to steal money from a woman. After his death the family becomes Balu's responsibility, and his attitude toward stealing changes when his mother discovers her son was a thief and sacrifices her life. How the family is saved forms the rest of the story.

Cast 
M. G. Ramachandran as Balu
B. Saroja Devi as Savithri
M. N. Nambiar as Ponnambalam / Duraisingam
K. A. Thangavelu as Jambu
V. Nagayya as the orphanage owner
M. N. Rajam as Tharaa
A. Karunanidhi as Marikozhundhu
Kula Deivam V. R. Rajagopal
M. Saroja as  Padma
K. Kannan as Singaram
G. Sakunthala as Kaveri
S. Rama Rao as Money lender
M. K. Mustafa as Raju
Lakshmiprabha

Production 
The film, a remake of the Hindi film Pocket Maar (1956), was directed by P. Neelakandan and V. Arunachalam under A. L. S. Productions, with story written by Chinna Annamalai and dialogues written by Kannadasan and Ma. Lakshmanan. Lakshmanan came up with two titles for the film: Thirudathe and Nalladhukku Kaalamillai, recommending the latter. M. G. Ramachandran objected, believing that audiences would think the title would represent his own opinion, and that the film actually exhorts people not to do wrong. Hence, the former title was finalised. B. Saroja Devi was cast as the lead actress at Ramachandran's insistence.

Soundtrack 
The music was composed by S. M. Subbaiah Naidu. Lyrics by Pattukkottai Kalyanasundaram, Kannadasan, Ku. Sa. Krishnamurthy, Ku. Ma. Balasubramaniam, M. K. Athmanathan, Muthukoothan and Ra. Pazhanisami. The song "Ennaruge Nee Irundhal" was composed by Viswanathan–Ramamoorthy. It was recorded for an earlier film produced by A. L. S. Productions, but was not used due to that film's length. With the permission of S. M. Subbaiah Naidu, producer A. L. Srinivasan used that song in this film. However, credit was not given to Viswanathan–Ramamoorthy in the title.

Release and reception 

Thirudathe was released on 23 March 1961. The film was a commercial success, running for 100 days in theatre.  According to Ashish Rajadhyaksha and Paul Willemen in the book Encyclopedia of Indian Cinema, for Ramachandran this marked a beginning of transition to roles that had "a contemporary setting", as opposed to period settings. Historian M. S. S. Pandian considers the film "inaugurated the MGR persona of a subaltern in the service of society", a trend that continued through the 1970s.

In popular culture 
In Andha 7 Naatkal (1981), Gopi (Master Haja Sheriff) sells stolen goods on the street; when police seize the goods, the poster on which the items were kept is revealed to be that of Thirudathe.

References

Bibliography

External links 
 

1960s Tamil-language films
1961 drama films
1961 films
Films directed by P. Neelakantan
Indian drama films
Tamil films remade in other languages
Tamil remakes of Hindi films